Samuli Aaltonen is a Finnish ice hockey player who plays for Porin Ässät in Liiga.

Career 
In the 2020-21 season Aaltonen played 9 games and put up 4 points.

In 2021 Aaltonen signed a 2+1 type of contract with Ässät.

References 

Living people
2000 births
Finnish ice hockey forwards
Ässät players
People from Uusikaupunki
Sportspeople from Southwest Finland